Junonia schmiedeli is a butterfly in the family Nymphalidae. It is found in Cameroon, the Democratic Republic of the Congo (Uele, Ituri, Kivu, Maniema, Sankuru, Lualaba), and Uganda.

References

schm
Butterflies of Africa
Butterflies described in 1920